Singleton Station is a pastoral lease in Central Australia, in the Northern Territory of Australia.

History 
Singleton Station is located on the traditional lands of the Kaytetye people, located 400 kilometres north of Mparntwe/Alice Springs, near the community of Ali Curung.

It is now a 294,000 hectare pastoral property. The pastoral lease has been held by Fortune Agribusiness since 2016.

Water license controversy 
In September 2020, Fortune Agribusiness applied to the Northern Territory Government for a licence to use the groundwater to develop one of Australia's largest fruit and vegetable farms over 3500-hectares of Singleton Station at a cost of $150 million. In April 2021, the Northern Territory Government issued the 40,000 megalitre license, the largest ever groundwater extraction licence ever granted in the Northern Territory. Traditional Owners of the area opposed the project based on the risks to water supplies and the 29 sacred cultural sites within the drawdown area. These concerns led to a formal review process but the license was regranted in November 2021 with additional conditions.

In February 2022, the Central Land Council and the Arid Lands Environment Centre announced it had served claims against the Northern Territory Government and Fortune Agribusiness on the basis that Environment Minister Eva Lawler made a number of legal errors in approving the licence.

References 

Pastoral leases in the Northern Territory
Stations (Australian agriculture)